Nicholas Saunders (25 January 1938 – 3 February 1998) was a British activist in the 'alternative' movement from the 1970s until his death in a car crash near Kroonstad, South Africa.

Alternative London
Saunders researched, self-published and distributed a series of editions of Alternative London, an encyclopaedic guide to living in London, particularly for young people squatting, living on low incomes, on the fringes of conventional society, and with alternative values and ambitions such as living communally and pursuing spiritual development. After traveling around the country in his live-in van, Saunders published the larger Alternative England and Wales guide in the same vein.  Topics included improvising plumbing, electricals, telecommunications (including phreaking), and other services, dealing with the legal and social security systems, sex, health, drug information, transport, food and spiritual religious and mystical systems.

Neals Yard
In 1976 Saunders moved into a warehouse in Neal's Yard, Covent Garden, where he opened a wholefood shop. This enterprise was successful and enabled him to set up "a hub of caring capitalist businesses which became the model for the fair-trade and eco-businesses that followed two decades later." His other businesses around the Yard included Neal's Yard Dairy, Monmouth Coffee Company, the 'Apothecary' (dispensing alternative and natural remedies, now known as Neal's Yard Remedies) and therapy rooms. Something of the character of Neal's Yard at the time is conveyed by pieces by Tim Hunkin: a water clock on the frontage of the shop and, inside the yard, a coin-operated animated wooden sculpture.

E for Ecstasy
Personal experience with MDMA (ecstasy) led Saunders to investigate and write about this drug. He wrote a series of books beginning with E for Ecstasy, and established the "ecstasy.org" website to provide not only general information but specific guides to various batches of the drug in circulation at any given time.

At the time of his death, he was researching the use by peoples in various parts of the world of psychoactive drugs as part of traditional social rituals.

Death
Saunders died on 3 February 1998 in a car crash near Kroonstad, South Africa.

Publications
 Alternative London. 1970. 50,000 copies printed.
 Alternative London. Revised edition, 1971. 52,300 copies printed.
 Alternative London Survival Guide for Strangers. Abridged edition, 1972. 50,000 copies printed.
 Alternative London. Revised edition, 1974. 38,000 copies printed.
 Alternative London. Revised edition, 1977.
 Alternative London. Revised edition, 1982. Edited by Georganne Downes.
 Alternative England and Wales. 1975.
 E For Ecstasy. 1993.
 Ecstasy and the Dance Culture. Revised and updated version of E For Ecstasy, 1995.
 Ecstasy Reconsidered. Revised and updated version of Ecstasy and the Dance Culture, 1997.

References

External links
Ecstasy.org website
EROWID page with pictures and links
1997 interview with Saunders
A space for people to share their thoughts and feelings on Nicholas' life on www.stain.org

1938 births
British psychedelic drug advocates
1998 deaths